Eurypegasus is one of two genera of seamoths in the family Pegasidae. Species in this genus are native to the Indian and Pacific Oceans.

Species
There are currently two recognized species in this genus:
 Eurypegasus draconis (Linnaeus, 1766) (Short dragonfish)
 Eurypegasus papilio (C. H. Gilbert, 1905) (Hawaiian sea-moth)

References 

 
Marine fish genera
Taxonomy articles created by Polbot